The Big Heat is the debut solo album by American musician Stan Ridgway (former Wall of Voodoo vocalist), released in 1986 by I.R.S. Records. Named after the 1953 film noir of the same name, the original release consisted of nine songs, including the No. 4 UK hit "Camouflage". In 1986, the album reached No. 131 on the Billboard 200. The album was re-released in 1993 with six additional tracks and again re-released in 2007.

Track listing

 Before the album's release, the track "Pick It Up (And Put It in Your Pocket)" was used in a 1985 episode of Miami Vice.

Accolades

Chart positions

Album

Singles

Personnel
Adapted from The Big Heat liner notes.

Stan Ridgway – lead vocals, guitar (A3, A5, B1, B2, B4), keyboards (A1, A4, B2-B4), harmonica (A1, B1), banjo (A2), bass guitar (B3), production (A3-A5), engineering (A3-A5)
Musicians
K. K. Barrett – drums (B1)
Chris Becerra – drums (B4)
Joe Berardi – drums (A5)
Hugo Burnham – percussion (A2)
Luis Cabaza – bass guitar (B2)
Mr. Christopher – violin (A1), cello (A1)
Mark Cohen – banjo (A4), mandolin (A4)
John Dentino – keyboards (A1)
Bruce Fowler – trombone (A5)
Richard Gibbs – instruments (B2)
Richard Greene – violin (A2)
Mark Lewis – backing vocals (B4)
Mark Morris – backing vocals (B4)
Bill Noland – keyboards (A1, B1, B2), piano (A2), production (B2)

Musicians (cont.)
Joe Ramirez – backing vocals (A4), drum programming (A4), guitar (B1)
Tom Rechoin – percussion (A2)
Steve Reid – percussion (B2)
Mark Terlizzi – bass guitar (A3)
Louis van den Berg – keyboards (A3-A5, B3, B4), producer (A3-A5), engineering (A3-A5)
Mike Watt – bass guitar (A3)
Pietra Wexstun – backing vocals (A3)
Eric Williams – guitar feedback
Bruce Zelesnik – drums (A1)
Production and additional personnel
Joe Chiccarelli – production (B2), engineering (B2), mixing (B2)
Mitchell Froom – production (A2), keyboards (A2)
Carl Grasso – art direction
Jim Hill – engineering (A2)
Hugh Jones – production (A1, B1), engineering (A1, B1), mixing (A1), keyboards (A1)
Scott Lindgren – photography, cover art
Andy Waterman – mixing (A2-A5, B1)

Release history

References

External links 
 

1986 debut albums
Stan Ridgway albums
Albums produced by Mitchell Froom
Albums produced by Hugh Jones (producer)
Albums produced by Stan Ridgway
I.R.S. Records albums
Albums produced by Joe Chiccarelli
Avant-pop albums